Manu Uncle is a 1988 Indian Malayalam-language  comedy-drama film directed by Dennis Joseph and produced by Joy Thomas. Starring Mammootty, M. G. Soman, Prathapachandran, Lissy, and B. Thyagarajan. Mohanlal made a cameo appearance as himself. The film was theatrically released on 7 April 1988 and was a box office success, completing a 100-day run in theatres. The film won a National Award for Best Children's Film. Suresh Gopi also appeared in a cameo role, playing the character S.I Minnal Prathapan. The character eventually developed a cult following several years after the release of the film.

Plot
Manu is a researcher in astronomy. Manu's father is a police officer. Ravunni, an exporter, is their family friend. Antony and Mary are neighbours of Manu. Their children are Dany a.k.a. Lother and Ikru.  Manu's elder sister's children come from Delhi for their vacation. They are accompanied by Dany and Ikru which make up a four-member team headed by Dany.

The children happen to visit the Art Museum on the very same time when Marthanda Varma's Crown is stolen. Ikru noticed the robbers, Gomez, Appu and Kittu but was not able to describe them to his Grandpa. Manu, who has a well-equipped communication system, is able to listen to a conversation between Kittu and Gomez planning to loot Marthanda Varma's Sword. Manu informs his father about the plan, and they both rush to Padmanabhapuram Palace. Gomez, meanwhile already gets hold of the sword and while escaping the palace encounters Manu and his father. A fight follows in which Manu is injured by Gomez; now Manu's father is in pursuit of the robbers alone. But the robbers kill Manu's father in a planned lorry accident. The viewers are just now able to figure out the mastermind behind the robbery is; Ravunni, the family friend.
Unfortunately for him though, the incident was witnessed by Khader, a young orphan who happened to be in that lorry. The robbers try to catch the boy, but the boy manages to escape from them and in the process ends up meeting the four children, and tells them that their Grandpa was not dead in an accident but was killed.

The curious children decide to investigate the murder. While intercepting a portable radio conversation between Gomez and Ravunni, the latter discloses his identity to Manu. Ravunni threatens Manu to stay away from his illegal export activities and warns Manu that, he will meet his father's fate. Ikru who had already met Gomez drew his picture which is noticed by Manu and Ravunni. Ravunni gets shocked seeing the drawing and Manu decides to garner more information about Ravunni after watching his tensed face. Manu breaks into Ravunni's house and validates his doubts. The children meanwhile decide to venture to the gang's hideout as per the directions from Khader. They are shocked on realising that it was Ravunni leading the gang. The gang sees the children who crossed their fence and Ravunni directs his men to kill them. But, soon Manu reaches there and saves the children. The movie ends with the robbers getting arrested by the police.

Cast

Crew
 Story and Direction ..... Dennis Joseph
 Screenplay, Dialogues and Lyrics .... Shibu Chakravarthy
 Producer .... Joy Thomas
 Distribution .... Jubilee Productions
 Cinematography .... Jayanan Vincent
 Editor .... K. Shankunny
 Stunt .... A. R. Basha
 Art Direction .... Sabu Pravadas
 Associate Direction .... Jimmy
 P. R. O. .... Ranji Kottayam
 Stills .... R. Sukumar
 Make up .... Thomas
 Costume Design .... Kumar

Awards
 National Film Award for Best Children's Film
 Kerala State Film Award for Best Children's Film

Soundtrack
Composer: Shyam; Lyricist: Shibu Chakravarthy
"Mele Veettile" .... K. S. Chithra
"Oru Kili" .... K. S. Chithra & M. G. Sreekumar

Trivia
Jagathy Sreekumar was originally supposed to play the role of SI 'Minnal' Prathapan, but he had other commitments during that time. Aliens, E.T. the Extra-Terrestrial & Close Encounters of the Third Kind were cited in this movie as a comparison to Manu's encounter with a cockroach through the telescope.

References

External links
 

1980s Malayalam-language films
1988 films
Indian children's films
Films shot in Kollam
Best Children's Film National Film Award winners
Films directed by Dennis Joseph
1988 directorial debut films